Luciano Ortelli (born 4 December 1956) is an Italian wrestler. He competed in the men's freestyle 82 kg at the 1984 Summer Olympics.

References

1956 births
Living people
Italian male sport wrestlers
Olympic wrestlers of Italy
Wrestlers at the 1984 Summer Olympics
Sportspeople from Naples